You Spoof Discovery: The ultimate viewer-submitted low-cost high-quality extremely entertaining Discovery parody special hosted by Mike Rowe of Dirty Jobs, who also narrates the series American Chopper, American Hot Rod and Deadliest Catch,  commonly shortened to You Spoof Discovery, is a one-hour special on the Discovery Channel which showed viewer-submitted parodies of Discovery Channel shows. The special premiered on February 25, 2007  and was hosted by Mike Rowe. Over 600 entries were submitted.  The makers of parodies that made it on the air were given $500 from the Discovery Channel. According to Jane Root, then the president of Discovery Channel, the series was intended to be the beginning of a new wave of viewer-generated content.

Parodied shows 
Parodied shows include:
 American Chopper
 Cash Cab
 Deadliest Catch
 Dirty Jobs
 Future Weapons
 It Takes a Thief
 MythBusters
 Survivorman

Advertising 

In summer of 2006, Discovery launched an ad featuring Mike Rowe asking viewers to submit parodies of their favorite Discovery shows. As he speaks, humorous things are drawn on the screen. For example,  "I'm with stupid" will appear along with an arrow pointing up on Mike's shirt.

In early February 2007, Discovery started advertising the special. The ad used the full name of the show.

See also
 Discovery Channel
 Mike Rowe

References

External links
 

Discovery Channel original programming
Parodies of television shows